Tomskiy Khutor is a village located in the Kharmang District of Gilgit-Baltistan, Pakistan.  The Pakistani Air Force has a base here.

References

Populated places in Kharmang District